The men's canoe sprint K-4 1,000 metres competition at the 2012 Olympic Games in London took place between 7 and 9 August at Eton Dorney.

The Australian team comprising Tate Smith, Dave Smith, Murray Stewart and Jacob Clear won the gold medal. Hungary won the silver medal and the Czech Republic took bronze.

Competition format

The competition comprised heats, a semi-final, and a final.  Heat winners advanced to the final, with all other boats getting a second chance in the semi-final.  The top six from the semi-final also advanced to the final.

Schedule
All times are British Summer Time (UTC+01:00)

Results

Heats
The fastest boat qualified for the final, remainder to a semi-final.

Heat 1

Heat 2

Semifinal
The fastest six boats qualified for the final.

Final

References

Canoeing at the 2012 Summer Olympics
Men's events at the 2012 Summer Olympics